Sweetheart 2005: Love Songs is a compilation album, released under Starbucks' Hear Music label in January 2005 in the United States. Sold in stores, the album features contemporary musicians covering classic love songs.

Track listing
"My Funny Valentine", performed by Rufus Wainwright (originally by Rodgers and Hart)
"Let My Love Open the Door", performed by M. Ward (originally by Pete Townshend, 1980)
"Buckets of Rain", performed by Neko Case (originally by Bob Dylan, 1975)
"Love Will Tear Us Apart", performed by Calexico (originally by Joy Division, 1980)
"She's Got Everything", performed by Old 97's (originally by The Kinks)
"How Can I Tell You", performed by Gary Jules (originally by Cat Stevens)
"Give Your Mama One Smile", performed by Madeleine Peyroux (originally by Big Bill Broonzy)
"The More I See You", performed by Sondre Lerche (music originally written by Harry Warren with lyrics by Mack Gordon, 1945)
"I Only Have Eyes for You", performed by Martina Topley-Bird (originally by The Flamingos)
"There is a Light That Never Goes Out", performed by Joseph Arthur (originally by The Smiths, 1986)
"Your Sweet Voice", performed by Milton Mapes (originally by Matthew Sweet)
"Use Me", performed by Jim White (originally by Bill Withers, 1972)
"Forever", performed by Dean Wareham (originally by The Beach Boys, 1970)
"Inutil Paisagem", performed by Vinicius Cantuária (originally by Antonio Carlos Jobim)
"A Nightingale Sang in Berkeley Square", performed by Mindy Smith (made famous by The Manhattan Transfer)

Personnel

Kato Aadland – guitar
Joseph Arthur – guitar, vocals, mixing, author, engineer, producer
Brendon Bell – assistant engineer
Paulinho Braga – drums
Paul Brainard – pedal steel guitar
Rob Burger – piano
Joey Burns – bass, guitar, vocals, double bass
Calexico – author
Vinicius Cantuária – guitar, producer, author, percussion, vocals
Neko Case – vocals, producer, author
Don Cobb – mastering
Eric Conn – mastering
John Convertino – piano, drums
Mike Coykendall – engineer, mixing
Danny Frankel – drums, snare drum
Maurice Gainen – mastering
Howe Gelb – piano
William Lee Golden – engineer
Patrick Granado – assistant engineer
Murry Hammond – bass, vocals
David Hungate – guitar, double bass
John Jarvis – piano
Larry Klein – producer
Lisa Laarman – creative director
David R. Legry – liner notes
Sondre Lerche – vocals, author
Stewart Lerman – producer, engineer, mixing
M. Ward – guitar, keyboards, author, vocals
Tucker Martine – drums (bass), hi-hat, snare drum, producer

Ed Maxwell – organ, bass, synthesizer, engineer
Mario J. McNulty – assistant engineer
Rhett Miller – vocals
Salim Nourallah – engineer, mixing
Old Joe Clarks – bass, drums
Gary Jules – producer, author
Gary Paczosa – mixing
Ben Peeler – lap steel guitar
Philip Peeples – drums
Madeleine Peyroux – guitar, mixing, author, engineer, vocals
Britta Phillips – bass, engineer, vocals, keyboards
Jon Rauhouse – Hawaiian guitar
Dorothy Robinett – clarinet
Rip Rowan – mixing
Tom Schick – engineer, mixing
Craig Schumacher – producer, engineer
Dave Sinko – engineer
Morten Skage – double bass
Mindy Smith – vocals, producer, author
Paul Socolow – bass
Jerry Tubb – mastering
Greg Vanderpool – electric guitar, author, vocals
Tony Visconti – mixing
Rufus Wainwright – vocals, author, producer
Dean Wareham – guitar, engineer, author, vocals
Joan Wasser – violin
Jim Waters – mellotron
Jim White – banjo, percussion, programming, vocals, keyboards, drums, melodica, slide banjo, author, producer

See also
 Sweetheart 2014

References

2005 compilation albums
Hear Music compilation albums
Covers albums
Pop compilation albums
Rock compilation albums